The Yaqui topminnow is a species of fish in the family Poeciliidae. Its scientific name is Poeciliopsis sonoriensis; it is also sometimes considered a subspecies of  Poeciliopsis occidentalis as P. o. sonoriensis. This fish is native to Mexico and the United States, with a few native and introduced populations persisting in Arizona in the United States, and a number of populations still extant in northern Sonora, Mexico.

Description
The Yaqui topminnow has an elongated, slightly curved body with a rounded to squared tail fin. The anal fin of the male is elongated into a copulatory organ used to inseminate the female. Along with other species of topminnow, Yaqui topminnow exhibit several relatively unique reproductive characteristics among fish: eggs are fertilized internally; the female can store sperm from several males in a special structure called the spermatheca, and can fertilize eggs for a prolonged period after receiving the sperm; the female can simultaneously carry a number of different broods at different stages of development; and they bear live young rather than lay eggs (Minckley, 1973; Miller et al.

During the breeding season, males may become jet black and exhibit aggressive breeding behavior, while others males may maintain the non-breeding coloration and attempt to mate inconspicuously with females. The female is tan or olivaceous with a pale belly and dark lateral band.

The species is closely related to the Gila topminnow (Poeciliopsis occidentalis), and is sometimes treated as a subspecies. The Yaqui topminnow can be distinguished by its superior mouth, longer snout, and the pattern of lateral banding on the body of the female, which rarely extends anterior to the bases of the pelvic fins.

Biology
This fish lives in shallow, warm, slow-moving waters containing thick algae and debris. It is most common in marshes, especially those fed by springs. It feeds on detritus and small bits of animal and plant material.

The female bears 20 or more young per brood, and may produce a brood about every 20 days. The species breeds year-round in many areas, but in habitats with fluctuating temperatures breeding occurs during the warmer months. The fish rarely lives more than one year.

Conservation
The fish has a limited range. It is considered to be a vulnerable species on the IUCN Red List. It faces the loss of its aquatic habitat types and competition with the western mosquitofish (Gambusia affinis).

Much of its United States population occurs on the San Bernardino National Wildlife Refuge, where it is protected.

References

External links
Froese, R. and D. Pauly, Eds. Poeciliopsis sonoriensis. FishBase. 2016.

Freshwater fish of Mexico
Taxa named by Charles Frédéric Girard
Fish described in 1859
Freshwater fish of the United States
sonoriensis